Al-Sabboura is a Syrian village in the Qatana District of the Rif Dimashq Governorate. According to the Syria Central Bureau of Statistics (CBS), Al-Sabboura had a population of 10,969 in the 2004 census.

Syrian civil war

On 13 October 2022, 18 Syrian military personnel were killed and 27 others were injured after a Syrian military bus was bombed on a road in the village.

References

External links

Populated places in Qatana District